Phengodes is a genus of glowworms in the beetle family Phengodidae. There are more than 30 described species in Phengodes.

Species
These 31 species belong to the genus Phengodes:

 Phengodes arizonensis Wittmer, 1976
 Phengodes atezcanus Zaragoza, 1980
 Phengodes bella Barber, 1913
 Phengodes bimaculata Gorham, 1881
 Phengodes bipenniera
 Phengodes bipennifera Gorham, 1881
 Phengodes bolivari Zaragoza-Caballero, 1981
 Phengodes brailovskyi Zaragoza & Wittmer, 1986-30
 Phengodes chamelensis Zaragoza, 2004-01
 Phengodes championi Pic, 1927
 Phengodes ecuadoriana Wittmer, 1988-29
 Phengodes fenestrata Wittmer, 1976-10
 Phengodes frontalis LeConte, 1881
 Phengodes fusciceps LeConte, 1861
 Phengodes inflata Wittmer, 1976-10
 Phengodes insignis Bourgeois, 1888
 Phengodes insulcata Pic, 1925
 Phengodes laticollis LeConte, 1881
 Phengodes leonilae Zaragoza & Wittmer, 1986-30
 Phengodes mexicana Wittmer, 1976
 Phengodes minor Gorham, 1881
 Phengodes nigricornis Gorham, 1881
 Phengodes nigromaculata Wittmer, 1976
 Phengodes osculati (Spinola, 1854)
 Phengodes plumosa (Olivier, 1790) (glow worm)
 Phengodes succinacius Zaragoza, 2004-01
 Phengodes tuxtlaensis Zaragoza, 1989-30
 Phengodes varicolor Zaragoza & Wittmer, 1986-30
 Phengodes variicornis Zaragoza & Wittmer, 1986-30
 Phengodes vazquezae Zaragoza, 1979-06
 Phengodes venezolana Wittmer, 1988-29

References

Further reading

External links

 

Phengodidae
Bioluminescent insects
Articles created by Qbugbot